Don Grolnick (September 23, 1947 – June 1, 1996) was an American jazz pianist, composer, and record producer. He was a member of the groups Steps Ahead and Dreams, both with Michael Brecker, and played often with the Brecker Brothers. As a session musician, he recorded with John Scofield, Billy Cobham, Roberta Flack, Harry Chapin, Dave Holland, Bette Midler, Marcus Miller, Bob Mintzer, Linda Ronstadt, David Sanborn, Carly Simon, J. D. Souther, Steely Dan, and James Taylor.

Career
Grolnick was born in Brooklyn and grew up in Levittown, New York. He began his musical life on accordion but later switched to piano. His interest in jazz began as a child when his father took him to a Count Basie concert, and soon after they also saw Erroll Garner perform at Carnegie Hall. He attended Tufts University with a major in philosophy.

After he left Tufts, he formed the jazz-rock band Fire & Ice with Ken Melville on guitar and Stuart Schulman, his friend since childhood, on bass guitar. They were the opening act for B.B. King, The Jeff Beck Group, and the Velvet Underground at Boston clubs like the Boston Tea Party and The Ark. This was Grolnick's first foray into rock and blues as a performer, and he began to write within the medium as well. Grolnick moved back to New York in 1969 and joined Melville in the jazz fusion band "D". He toured with Linda Ronstadt in 1977 and again in 1984 when she was performing American standards with Nelson Riddle and his orchestra.

Grolnick died at the age of 48 on June 1, 1996 from Non-Hodgkin lymphoma. His cremated remains are interred in the columbarium at Fort Hill Cemetery in Montauk, New York.

Discography

As leader/co-leader

Sources:

With Brecker Brothers
 1975 The Brecker Bros.
 1976 Back to Back
 1977 Don't Stop the Music
 1980 Detente
With Dreams
 1971 Imagine My Surprise
With Steps Ahead 
 1982 Smokin' in the Pit

As sideman
With Gato Barbieri
 1976 Caliente!
 1978 Ruby, Ruby
 1988 Passion and Fire
With Joe Beck
1975 Beck (Kudu)
With George Benson
 1975 Good King Bad (CTI)
 1976 Benson & Farrell with Joe Farrell (CTI)

With Ron Carter
 1975 Anything Goes (Kudu)
 1976 Yellow & Green (CTI)
 1982 El Noche Sol

With Peter Erskine
 1982 Peter Erskine
 1986 Transition

With Steve Khan
 1977 Tightrope
 1978 The Blue Man
 1979 Arrows

With Melissa Manchester
 1974 Bright Eyes
 1977 Singin'...

With The Manhattan Transfer
 1975 The Manhattan Transfer
 1977 Pastiche

With Bob Mintzer
 1982 Source
 1983 Papa Lips
 1985 Incredible Journey
 1988 Spectrum
 1989 Urban Contours

With Esther Phillips
 1975 Esther Phillips and Joe Beck
 1975 What a Diff'rence a Day Makes
 1976 Capricorn Princess
 1976 For All We Know

With Bonnie Raitt
 1974 Streetlights
 1979 The Glow

With Linda Ronstadt
 1977 Simple Dreams
 1978 Living in the USA
 1982 Get Closer
 1983 What's New
 1984 Lush Life
 1986 For Sentimental Reasons
 1989 Cry Like a Rainstorm, Howl Like the Wind

With David Sanborn
 1975 Beck & Sanborn
 1975 Taking Off
 1978 Heart to Heart
 1979 Hideaway
 1984 Straight to the Heart
 1987 A Change of Heart
 1988 Love Songs

With John Scofield
 1986 Still Warm
 1988 Flat Out

With Don Sebesky
 1976 The Rape of El Morro
 1980 Sebesky Fantasy

With Carly Simon
 1978 Boys in the Trees
 1979 Spy
 1980 Come Upstairs
 1983 Hello Big Man

With Steely Dan
 1976 The Royal Scam
 1977 Aja
 1980 Gaucho

With James Taylor
 1974 Walking Man
 1979 Flag
 1981 Dad Loves His Work
 1985 That's Why I'm Here
 1988 Never Die Young
 1991 New Moon Shine
 1993 Live

With John Tropea
 1975 Tropea
 1977 Short Trip to Space
 1979 To Touch You Again
 1991 NYC Cats Direct

With others
 1973 Bette Midler, Bette Midler
 1974 A Beautiful Thing, Cleo Laine
 1974 Barry Manilow II, Barry Manilow
 1974 The Chicago Theme, Hubert Laws
 1975 Mark Murphy Sings, Mark Murphy
 1976 Main Squeeze, Chuck Mangione
 1976 Second Childhood, Phoebe Snow
 1976 Speak No Evil, Buddy Rich
 1976 The Main Attraction, Grant Green
 1977 Blue Lights in the Basement, Roberta Flack
 1977 In My Stride, David Ruffin
 1977 Inner Conflicts, Billy Cobham
 1977 Libby Titus, Libby Titus
 1977 Love Play, Mike Mainieri
 1977 Ringo the 4th, Ringo Starr
 1977 Ghost Writer, Garland Jeffreys
 1979 Yama, Art Farmer
 1979 You're Only Lonely, J.D. Souther
 1979 The Cat and the Hat, Ben Sidran
 1980 Dreamers Matinee, Don Schlitz
 1980 Middle Man, Boz Scaggs
 1980 Naughty, Chaka Khan
 1980 One Bad Habit, Michael Franks
 1980 One-Trick Pony, Paul Simon
 1980 Red Cab to Manhattan, Stephen Bishop
 1980 Whirlwind, Andrew Gold
 1981 Wanderlust, Mike Mainieri
 1982 Anyone Can See, Irene Cara
 1983 Mobo Vols. 1 & 2, Kazumi Watanabe
 1987 Short Stories, Bob Berg
 1988 Don't Try This at Home, Michael Brecker
 1988 Tears of Joy, Tuck & Patti
 1988 Time in Place, Mike Stern
 1990 Now You See It... (Now You Don't), Michael Brecker (Grolnick as Producer & Composer)
 1991 Warm Your Heart, Aaron Neville

References

External links
Jazz Cares
Barnes and Noble bio

American jazz pianists
American male pianists
American pop pianists
1948 births
1996 deaths
Musicians from Brooklyn
Blue Note Records artists
People from Levittown, New York
20th-century American pianists
Jazz musicians from New York (state)
American male jazz musicians
American rock keyboardists
American jazz keyboardists
American pop keyboardists
Deaths from non-Hodgkin lymphoma
Deaths from cancer in New York (state)
Steps Ahead members
Dreams (band) members
20th-century American keyboardists
20th-century American male musicians
Tufts University School of Arts and Sciences alumni